John Ritson Potter (born 14 December 1949) is a former English cricketer.  Potter was a right-handed batsman.  He was born in Middlesbrough, Yorkshire.

Potter made his debut for Oxfordshire in the 1973 Minor Counties Championship against Buckinghamshire.  Potter played Minor counties cricket for Oxfordshire from 1973 to 1975 which included 20 Minor Counties Championship matches.  He made his List A debut against Cornwall in the 1975 Gillette Cup.  In this match he scored 75 unbeaten runs.  He played a further List A match against Gloucestershire in the 2nd round of the same competition.  In his second match, he scored 19 runs before being dismissed by Jack Davey.

References

External links
John Potter at ESPNcricinfo

1949 births
Living people
Cricketers from Middlesbrough
English cricketers
Oxfordshire cricketers
English cricketers of 1969 to 2000